Gospel Church, Zhenjiang, locally known as Gospel Church, Daxi Road, is a Protestant church located in Runzhou District of Zhenjiang, Jiangsu, China.

History 
In 1889, the Methodist Episcopal Church bought four mu lands to build the Gospel Church and its annex Chongdao School, designing by American missionary Carl Frederick Kupfer.

During the Second Sino-Japanese War, the church sheltered a large number of refugees from the impending Japanese slaughter. The church was looted when the Imperial Japanese Army occupied Jiangsu.

The church was closed during the ten-year Cultural Revolution and was officially reopened to the public in 1980. In May 1982, it was designated as a municipal cultural relic preservation organ by the Zhenjiang government.

Gallery

References

Further reading 
 

Churches in Zhenjiang
Tourist attractions in Zhenjiang
1889 establishments in China
Protestant churches in China
Churches completed in 1889